Batu Caves (Chinese: 黑风洞、峇都喼, Tamil: பத்துமலை) is a mukim and town in Gombak District, Selangor, Malaysia. The town is experiencing an increase in residences due to a housing boom in the center of the city.

Townships and villages
Taman Jasa
Taman Pinggiran Batu Caves
Taman Industri Bolton
Kampung Indian Settlement
Taman Amaniah
Taman Batu Caves
Taman Selasih
Taman Samudera
Taman Desa Bakti
Taman Desa Minang
Taman Ehsan
Taman Koperasi Polis
Astana Gemilang
Perkampungan Melayu Seri Gombak
Taman Selayang
Taman Seri Selayang
Kampung Melayu
Kampung Baru Batu Caves
Kampung Laksamana
Kampung Nakhoda
Kampung Bendahara
Kampung Lalat
Kampung Sungai Kertas
Kampung Datuk Karim
Taman Gombak Permai
Selayang Mulia
Selayang Mutiara
Kampung Melayu Sri Wira Damai

Places of Worships
Batu Caves temple
Tiong Yee Temple (忠义庙)
Chee Choy Kong Temple (自在宫)
Xian Fa Shi Gong Temple (仙法师公古庙)
Al-Amaniah Mosque
Surau Al-Kahfi
Surau Al-Ubudiah
Masjid Al-Khairiyah
Surau Al-Ikhwan

Education

The housing boom in the town has led more residents to move into the town and led to the need for more new schools.

Kindergartens

 Private
 Tadika Setia Kasih
 Tadika Disney
 Tadika Islam Sayidina Abu-Bakar As-Siddiq
 3Q MRC Junior Taman Sri Gombak
 Public
 Tabika Kemas Perkampungan Melayu
 Tabika Kemas Taman Seri Gombak

Primary schools

Currently, there are only six primary schools in the town.

 Public
 Sekolah Kebangsaan Taman Seri Gombak
 Sekolah Kebangsaan Taman Seri Gombak 2
 Sekolah Kebangsaan Taman Samudera
 Sekolah Kebangsaan Taman Selasih
 Sekolah Jenis Kebangsaan (Tamil) Batu Caves
 Sekolah Rendah Kebangsaan Taman Selayang (1)
 Sekolah Rendah Kebangsaan Taman Selayang (2)
 Sekolah Rendah Islam Saidina Abu Bakar As-Siddiq

Secondary schools
 Public
 Sekolah Menengah Kebangsaan Seri Gombak
 Sekolah Menengah Kebangsaan Hillcrest
 Sekolah Menengah Taman Selayang
 Sekolah Menengah Seri Selayang

Current Development

Several new business centre have opened at the town heart and have raises the overall land-value. The development of the new-mosque have boost the land-value of the surrounding area at Taman Sri Gombak near the Tasik Taman Seri Gombak besides simplify the citizens and students to go to mosque for pray.

Gallery

Transportation

Public transport
The main rail station serving Batu Caves is the  Batu Caves Komuter station, opened in 2010 as part of the refurbishment of the Sentul-Batu Caves branch line.

rapidKL and Selangor Omnibus buses serve this town.

Car
Batu Caves is located right next to the MRR2 Federal Route 28. The interchanges to East Coast Expressway (which goes to Kuantan and Kuala Terengganu) and Duta–Ulu Klang Expressway (which leads to Mont Kiara and Segambut) are located nearby.

Politics
Batu Caves is part of the Gombak parliamentary constituency, currently represented by Amirudin Shari of Parti Keadilan Rakyat. Batu Caves is covered by the Sungai Tua constituency in the Selangor State Legislative Assembly, currently represented by Amirudin Shari of Parti Keadilan Rakyat. He is also the current Menteri Besar of Selangor.

References

Gombak District
Towns in Selangor
Mukims of Selangor